Frank Sidoris (born Las Vegas, Nevada, United States) is an American guitarist who started his professional career as a member of the American rock band The Cab from August 2011 to early 2012. He left the group to join Slash's solo-project band, Slash feat. Myles Kennedy and the Conspirators, as their permanent touring rhythm guitarist, in support of their albums Apocalyptic Love (2012), and World on Fire (2014). He became an official group member for the album Living the Dream (2018).

References

People from the Las Vegas Valley
Year of birth missing (living people)
Living people
American rock guitarists
American male guitarists